Louis Peter "Fats" Barle (June 23, 1916 – December 30, 1996) was an American professional basketball and football player.

Professional careers

Football
Barle had a brief career in the National Football League. He only appeared in four total games: one in 1938 for the Detroit Lions, and three in 1939 for the Cleveland Rams. He played the halfback position and scored two career touchdowns.

Basketball
After his professional football career ended, Barle played for the Oshkosh All-Stars in the National Basketball League from 1939–40 to 1942–43 and averaged 5.0 points per game. A forward, he was a two-time NBL champion, in 1941 and 1942.

References

External links
University of Minnesota Duluth Hall of Fame profile

1916 births
1996 deaths
American football halfbacks
American men's basketball players
Basketball players from Minnesota
Cleveland Rams players
Detroit Lions players
Forwards (basketball)
Minnesota Duluth Bulldogs football players
Minnesota Duluth Bulldogs men's basketball players
Oshkosh All-Stars players
People from Gilbert, Minnesota
Sportspeople from Duluth, Minnesota
Players of American football from Duluth, Minnesota